The Changan Lumin is a battery electric city car produced by Changan Automobile.

Overview

In April 2022, Changan unveiled a new city car, creating a new Lumin model line dedicated to affordable electric cars. The small 3-door model has been kept in a modern design, distinguished by a round silhouette with characteristic, round headlights and rear lamps and a two-color painted body. The modular EPA0 platform made it possible to create space in the cabin for 4 passengers.

The interior of the Lumin is kept in a minimalist, simple design that limits the surfaces with instruments to a minimum. The dashboard was dominated by a 10.25-inch touchscreen multimedia system, and the standard equipment maintained a rich level with, among others, radio, navigation, connectivity with smartphone interfaces and adaptive cruise control.

The Lumin was built for the domestic Chinese market, where sales began two months after its debut in June 2022. It is positioned as a low-cost city car, with a price starting at 48,900 yuan at its debut, and competing for the intensively developing market of similar structures in China.

Specifications
The vehicle is available with two battery packs supplied by the Chinese company CATL, distinguished by a capacity of 13 kWh or 18 kWh.

References

Lumin
Cars introduced in 2022
City cars
Front-wheel-drive vehicles
Hatchbacks
Electric city cars
Production electric cars